The Daily Republican is an American daily newspaper published Mondays through Fridays in Marion, Illinois. In 1987, the paper was acquired by Hollinger. Former owner GateHouse Media purchased roughly 160 daily and weekly newspapers from Hollinger in 1997.

The newspaper covers Williamson County, including the communities of Carterville, Herrin, Johnston City and Marion.

References

External links 
 

Gannett publications
Newspapers published in Illinois
Williamson County, Illinois